MK Metro was a bus company operating in Milton Keynes from 1997 until 2010.

History

In 1997, Stagecoach was ordered by the Office of Fair Trading to divest of its operations in Milton Keynes and Huntingdon. This followed an investigation in 1996 into its acquisition of Cambus Holdings which was deemed to have led to an unacceptable monopoly of bus operations in Cambridgeshire, Corby, East Northamptonshire, Kettering, Wellingborough, Bedford and Mid Bedfordshire.

The assets of Milton Keynes Citybus were purchased on 2 May 1997 by bus entrepreneur Julian Peddle, using a new company Premier Buses Limited both to operate in Huntingdon (under the Premier Buses brand name) and also as a holding company with which to purchase MK Metro. The operation was rebranded as MK Metro with a bright yellow and blue livery introduced.

In February 2006, the business was purchased by Arriva and integrated into its Arriva Shires & Essex subsidiary. The MK Metro brand was retained with a new logo introduced in 2007.

On 25 April 2010, the Arriva brand and livery were introduced. Milton Keynes services began to operate under the sub brand of MK Star, and the change of name coincided with a number of controversial service changes.

Fleet
The fleet ranged from mainly Dennis Darts (high floor and low floor, with a variety of bodywork), to Mercedes-Benz minibuses and Optare Solos. Double-deck Optare Spectras, and Wright Solar bodied Scania L94UBs were also operated.

Fleet summary
Dennis Dart
Dennis Dart SLF
VDL SB120
Mercedes-Benz Vario
Optare Solo
Optare Spectra
Scania L94UB
Alexander Dennis Enviro300
Mercedes-Benz Citaro

Routes
MK Metro ran over 30 services. Most routes passed through or served Central Milton Keynes. However, routes 16 and 30/31 did not. The routes were generally numbered from 1 to 30, although there were some omissions and some routes in the 30s, as well as a new service numbered 300.

The key services were numbered 1 to 8, and ran every 10 to 20 minutes. Key services ran through the busiest parts of the city, for example to Bletchley and the District centres. Intermediate services ran from every 20 minutes up to every hour. These routes cover areas in more detail, for example serving through the grid squares, while key services mostly ran on the main roads. The other routes ran at a frequency of every hour or less. These services linked locations outside Milton Keynes into the city, or linked neighbourhoods into the nearest centre.

Note that this list of routes is for historical interest. It is not a list of the current routes operated by Arriva Shires & Essex.

Former key services
1 / B / C: City Centre – Green Park – Newport Pagnell – Olney – Bedford / Northampton
2: Westcroft – Oxley Park – Grange Farm – City Centre – Willen – Poets Estate – Newport Pagnell
4 / A / E: Wolverton – Stony Stratford – City Centre – Hospital – Whaddon Way – Bletchley
5 / E: Wolverton – Bradville – City Centre – Hospital – Bletchley – Lakes Estate
7 / E: Wolverton – Stantonbury – City Centre – Bletchley – Newton Longville / Lakes Estate
7 A: Wolverton – Great Linford – Neath Hill – City Centre
8: Westcroft – Shenley Brook End – City Centre – Kingston – Bletchley / Woburn Sands

Intermediate Services
These routes were operated by MK Metro after its take-over by Arriva, but before the rebranding and new timetable launch on 24 April 2010.
2E: Wolverton – Heelands – City Centre – Willen – Poets Estate – Newport Pagnell
3E: Wolverton – Great Linford – City Centre – Shenley Church End – Furzton – Westcroft
6 / A: Wolverton / Bradville – Heelands – City Centre – Hospital- Emerson Valley – Bletchley
9 / A: City Centre – Shenley Lodge – Furzton – West Bletchley – Bletchley
12: Wolverton – Greenleys – Bradwell – City Centre – Kents Hill – Open University – Caldecotte
20: Bletchley – Tattenhoe – Westcroft – City Centre – Hospital – Walnut Tree
26E: Bletchley – Furzton – City Centre – Walnut Tree – Kingston Centre
29: Bletchley – Hospital – Oldbrook – City Centre – Crownhill – Shenley Church End
32: City Centre – Buckingham – Little Tingewick (peak hours)
39: Bletchley – Whaddon Way – Oldbrook – City Centre – Crownhill – Shenley Church End
300: City Centre – Broughton Gate – Kingston / Magna Park

Other former services
11: Milton Keynes – Monkston – Kingston – Woburn Sands – Bow Brickhill – Bletchley
13: Stony Stratford – Stantonbury – City Centre – Bletchley – Lakes Estate
14: City Centre – Stony Stratford – Old Stratford – Deanshanger / Wicken
16: Bletchley – West Bletchley – Emerson Valley – Westcroft
17A: Milton Keynes – Moulsoe – Cranfield
17B: City Centre – Great Linford – Newport Pagnell – Cranfield
18: City Centre – Woolstone – Woughton Park – Simpson – Bletchley
30 / 31: Newport Pagnell – Wolverton – Stony Stratford – Bletchley
32A: Buckingham Town Service
33: Milton Keynes – Blue Bridge – Wolverton – Hanslope – Roade – Northampton
(NN)11 Northampton – Kingsley – Parklands – Links View – Kingsley – Northampton (only serves Links View on return from Parklands)
(NN)21 Northampton – University Avenue Campus – Kingsthorpe – University Park Campus (ceased due to contract loss)

References

External links

www.mkmetro.co.uk/
www.arrivabus.co.uk/mkstar
Flickr gallery

Arriva Group bus operators in England
Transport in Milton Keynes
1997 establishments in England
2010 disestablishments in England
Transport companies established in 1997
Transport companies disestablished in 2010
Former bus operators in Bedfordshire
Former bus operators in Buckinghamshire
Former bus operators in Northamptonshire